Supreme Commander may refer to:

Military
 Commander-in-chief, a military rank
 Generalissimo or generalissimus, a (usually informal) term for a senior military commander, or a foreign term for a senior general
 Allied Supreme Commander, position held by Marshal Ferdinand Foch during World War I
 Supreme Allied Commander, title held by the most senior commander within certain multinational military alliances
 Supreme Allied Commander Europe, military commander of the North Atlantic Treaty Organization (NATO)
 Supreme Allied Commander Atlantic, head of NATO's now-defunct Allied Command Atlantic
 Supreme Commander for the Allied Powers, title held by General Douglas MacArthur during the Occupation of Japan following World War II
 Supreme Commander of the People's Republic of China
 Supreme Commander of the Armed Forces of North Korea
 Supreme Commander of the Malaysian Armed Forces
 Supreme Commander-in-Chief of the Armed Forces of the Russian Federation
 Supreme Commander of the Swedish Armed Forces
Supreme Commander of the Unified Armed Forces of the Warsaw Treaty Organization
 Supreme commander (militant), a title used for the head of a militant group or an organization

Media
 Supreme Commander video game series developed by Gas Powered Games
 Supreme Commander (video game), real-time strategy video game released in 2007
 Supreme Commander: Forged Alliance, a stand-alone expansion for Supreme Commander released in 2007
 Supreme Commander 2, the sequel to Supreme Commander released in 2010

See also
 Commander in Chief (disambiguation)